Lago Vargas Airport ,  is a rural airstrip in the Aysén Region of Chile. A service road connects it to the Carretera Austral. The nearest town is Cochrane,  to the northeast.

It is in mountainous terrain.

See also

Transport in Chile
List of airports in Chile

References

External links
OpenStreetMap - Lago Vargas
HERE Maps - Lago Vargas
OurAirports - Lago Vargas
FallingRain - Lago Vargas Airport

Airports in Aysén Region